Davudabad (also Romanized as Dāvūdābād and Dāvodābād) is a city in the Central District of Arak County, Markazi Province, Iran.  At the 2006 census, its population was 5,517, in 1,535 families.

References

Populated places in Arak County

Cities in Markazi Province